WinMerge is a free software tool for data comparison and merging of text-like files. It is useful for determining what has changed between versions, and then merging changes between versions.

For a planned development of version 3.x  no commits have been made to the 3.0 codebase since 2011.

In 2011 a fork of the 2.x codebase titled "WinMerge 2011" was created. This new branch has continued to see active feature and bug fix development. It has also removed ATL/MFC dependencies so that WinMerge can be built using the free Visual C++ Express editions.

WinMerge runs on Microsoft Windows.

Features
 Visual differencing and merging of text files
 Flexible editor with syntax highlighting, line numbers, and word-wrap
 Handles DOS, Unix, and Mac text file formats
 Unicode support (as of version 2.8.0, UTF-8 files are correctly read without a BOM)
 Difference pane shows current difference in two vertical panes
 Location pane shows map of files compared
 Highlights differences inside lines in file compare
 Can also generate HTML report with differences highlighted
 Regular expression-based file filters in directory compare allow excluding and including items
 Moved lines detection in file compare
 Ability to ignore whitespace and letter case changes
 Creates patch files
 Shell integration (supports 64-bit Windows versions)
 Rudimentary Visual SourceSafe and Rational ClearCase integration
 Archive file support using 7-Zip
 Plug-ins
 Language localization via plain-text PO files
 Online manual and installed HTML help manual
 Generates normal, context, and unified patches.

See also

Comparison of file comparison tools

References

External links
 
 
 Compare and merge files and folders with WinMerge Lifehacker
 WinMerge Portable
 Sdottaka's WinMerge on BitBucket and on GitHub (a fork with additional features and Japanese language support) (gone)
 WinMerge 2011 on BitBucket and on GitHub (a fork with additional features) (gone)

File comparison tools
Free file comparison tools
Free software programmed in C++
Windows-only free software